Lukas Thürauer (born 21 December 1987) is an Austrian footballer who plays for Kremser SC.

Career statistics

References

External links

Austrian footballers
Austrian Football Bundesliga players
FC Admira Wacker Mödling players
1987 births
Living people
SKN St. Pölten players
Kremser SC players
Association football midfielders
People from Krems an der Donau
Footballers from Lower Austria